Simpson is an unincorporated community in Pleasant Grove Township, Olmsted County, Minnesota, United States, near Rochester and Stewartville.  The community is located along Olmsted County Road 1 (Simpson Road) near County Road 16 and 68th Street SE.  Whitney Creek flows nearby.

History
Simpson was platted in 1890, and named for Thomas Simpson, a railroad official. A post office was established at Simpson in 1890, and remained in operation until 1956.

References

Unincorporated communities in Olmsted County, Minnesota
Unincorporated communities in Minnesota